The Identity card of North Macedonia (Macedonian: Лична карта) is a compulsory identity document issued in North Macedonia. The document is issued by the police on behalf of the Ministry of Interior.

History
Before 1912, when the area of modern-day North Macedonia was still part of the Ottoman Empire, the residents of the region, like other Ottoman citizens, were required to hold Ottoman identity cards. The cards were known in Ottoman Turkish as nüfus tezkeresi, or in Macedonian as nofuz. After 1912, the territory that was to become North Macedonia was annexed by Serbia and became part of Kingdom of Yugoslavia and the identity documents changed again. From 1945 to 1991, when the present day Republic of North Macedonia was a constituent republic of Yugoslavia, citizens possessed Yugoslav identity documents. Under the Yugoslav federal system, each republic had its own variety of identity documents; in particular, Yugoslav identity documents issued since 1974 in SR Macedonia were printed in Macedonian, rather than in Serbo-Croatian.

Physical appearance 
The identity card of North Macedonia is a plastic ID-1-(bankcard) format. The left side shows a photograph of the face the bearer. On the top left corner of the front, the name Република Северна Македонија (Macedonian)/Republic of North Macedonia (English) in capitals, and below it the word Личната карта/Identity card is shown. The flag and the coat of arms are also displayed on the identity card. Every person over 18 is required to obtain an identity card.

Printed data

The descriptions of the fields are printed in Macedonian and English.

Front side:
Surname
Name
Nationality
Sex
Date of birth
Personal number
Date of issue
Date of expiry
Holder's signature
Back side:
 Place of birth
 Permanent residence
 Address
 Authority
 ID number
 Machine-readable zone starting with IDMKD

International travel 
The Identity card of North Macedonia can be used for travelling to and staying in some countries without the need for a passport on the basis of bilateral agreements:

See also 
North Macedonian passport
 Driving licence in North Macedonia

Notes

References

External links 
Ministry of Internal Affairs - Republic of North Macedonia (in Macedonian)

Law of North Macedonia
North Macedonia